The Ford EEC or Electronic Engine Control is a series of ECU (or Engine Control Unit) that was designed and built by Ford Motor Company. The first system, EEC I, used processors and components developed by Toshiba in 1973. It began production in 1974, and went into mass production in 1975. It subsequently went through several model iterations.

EEC I and II 
The EEC I and EEC II modules used a common processor and memory so they can be described together. The microprocessor was a 12-bit central processing unit manufactured by Toshiba, the TLCS-12, which began development in 1971 and was completed in 1973. It was a 32mm² chip with about 2,800 silicon gates, manufactured on a 6 µm process. The system's semiconductor memory included 512-bit RAM, 2kb ROM and 2kb EPROM. The system began production in 1974, and went into mass production in 1975.

EEC-III 
This system was used on certain 1981-83 vehicles. There were two different EEC-III modules; one for use with a feedback carburetor, and one for use with Ford's "Central" throttle-body  fuel injection system. The module size and shape were approximately the same as the EEC-II and still utilized the external memory module. The two modules had differently keyed connectors to prevent accidental insertion in the wrong vehicle.

EEC-III uses a Duraspark III module (brown grommet where wires emerge) and a Duraspark II ignition coil. A resistance wire is used in the primary circuit. The distributors in EEC-III (and later) systems eliminate conventional mechanical and vacuum advance mechanisms. All timing is controlled by the engine computer, which is capable of firing the spark plug at any point within a 50-degree range depending on calibration. This increased spark capability requires greater separation of adjacent distributor cap electrodes to prevent cross-fire, resulting in a large-diameter distributor cap.

EEC-III on carbureted cars controlled the same Ford 7200 VV carburetor as the EEC-II. On fuel-injected cars, the module fired two high pressure (approximately 40 psi) fuel injectors that were mounted in a throttle body attached to a traditional intake manifold in the center valley of the 5.0 liter (302 cid) engine.

The processor was designed and manufactured by Motorola. It featured an 8-bit data length, a 10-bit instruction length and a 13-bit address length. The address space was "paged", meaning you could not directly address all of the address space without special instructions. There were 4 pages. Page 0 was for normal (background) code. Page 1 was for interrupt code. Page 2 was also for background, but could only be accessed by a special "Jump Page" instruction from page 0. Page 3 was used to store parametric ("calibration") data or additional interrupt level code. This chip was never sold commercially. Like EEC-I and -II, all code was written in assembly language.

The processor chips were manufactured by Motorola, and the modules were designed and assembled by Motorola, Toshiba, or Ford. The designs were functionally equivalent but slightly different components were used. Motorola optimized their design to use as many of their own components as possible.

EEC-IV 

These EEC-IV were used on the Ford/Cosworth 1.5L turbo Formula 1 engine in 1985.

EEC-V 
Additional performance needs drove Ford Electronics to develop an enhanced microprocessor named the 8065 building on EEC-IV technology.  Memory was expanded from 64K to 1 megabyte, speed tripled, and I/O more than doubled. Additional interrupts and improved time controlled I/O allowed continued use of EEC-IV code and extended the family lifetime to almost 20 years in production.

EEC-V DPC 
European Ford Diesel Duratorq engines (all TDDi and TDCi starting with model year 2000) used EEC-V DPC-xxx series, which used variant of Intel i196 microcontroller with 28F200 flash memory. The EEC-V DPC ECUs were later replaced by Delphi, Bosch EDC16, Siemens SID80x/SID20x, or Visteon DCU ECUs.

Visteon Levanta 
Visteon Levanta 'Black Oak' PCM is the first ECU that used Freescale PowerPC architecture. The ECU was used in Ford Mondeo, Galaxy, Focus and Ka - 1.8/2.0/2.5/3.0 Duratec HE/I4 engine.

EEC-150 
EEC-150 for 3.0/4.0 V6/4.6 SOHC engines uses PowerPC, however compared to Visteon Levanta the ECU is closer to EEC-VI by design.

EEC-VI 
EEC-VI is a PowerPC microcontroller used by Ford Motor Company up to 2013 models. Wide ranges of ECU variants exist. EEC-VI use ISO15765 or ISO14229 (UDS) over ISO15765 protocol for diagnostics.

EEC-VII and beyond 
EEC-VII Is the latest system with a PowerPC microcontroller used by Ford Motor Company, utilizing mostly the CAN bus and Ford's proprietary MS-CAN architecture. Other variations currently exist, but no additional information about them is available at this time.

References 

Ford Motor Company
Assembly language software
Engine technology
Automotive technology tradenames